Allium prostratum is an Asian species of wild onion native to Siberia (Zabaykalsky Krai, Buryatia, Yakutia), Mongolia, Inner Mongolia, and Xinjiang. It grows in sunlit locations on steppes and rocky slopes.

Allium prostratum spreads by means of a robust horizontal rhizome. It produces 1 or 2 bulbs up to 10 mm in diameter. Scape is up to 25 cm tall. Leaves are tubular, shorter than the scape. Umbel is hemispheric, with purple flowers.

References

prostratum
Onions
Flora of temperate Asia
Plants described in 1822